The 1986 Georgia Tech Yellow Jackets football team represented the Georgia Institute of Technology during the 1986 NCAA Division I-A football season. The Yellow Jackets were led by head coach Bill Curry, in his seventh and final year with the team, and played their home games at Grant Field in Atlanta. The team competed as members of the Atlantic Coast Conference, finishing in fourth.

Schedule

References

Georgia Tech
Georgia Tech Yellow Jackets football seasons
Georgia Tech Yellow Jackets football